Surface is an American science fiction television series created by Jonas and Josh Pate, that premiered on NBC on September 19, 2005. The program aired ten episodes before going on hiatus on November 28, 2005. It returned for five more episodes on January 2, 2006, and ended its run on February 6.

On May 15, 2006, NBC officially announced that the series had been cancelled after one season.

Synopsis
During a routine submersible dive in the North Pacific Ocean, California oceanographer Laura Daughtery (Lake Bell) is attacked by an unknown life-form that appears out of a field of craters on the ocean's floor. Miles Barnett (Carter Jenkins), a 14-year old North Carolina teenager, finds himself face to face with the strange sea creature after falling off his wakeboard during a nighttime outing with his friends. Meanwhile, Richard Connelly (Jay R. Ferguson), a Louisiana man on a fishing trip, loses his brother in a suspicious diving accident when a creature drags him to the depths of the Gulf of Mexico.

All around the world, strange things are occurring in the world's oceans. Shooting stars fall from the night sky into the Caribbean Sea; a horrific howl tears apart a South African lighthouse. In South Carolina, an unknown carcass washes up on a public beach, prompting the government to evacuate and cordon off the area, claiming it as a beached whale killed by red tide poisoning.

Meanwhile, Daughtery's research is seized by government officials led by a mysterious Croatian scientist, Dr. Aleksander Cirko (Rade Šerbedžija); after attempting to confront them, she is fired. Curious as to what he's seen, Miles ventures back to the area where he first spotted the creature only to find the water covered in strange pods he classifies as "eggs"; he takes one home and places it in his parents' fish tank. Unable to cope with his brother's disappearance, Connely ventures to South Carolina to see the creature for himself. Connelly meets Daughtery upon arrival after they are both taken into custody due to asking too many questions. When the fish in Miles' tank disappear and the tank breaks, Miles discovers that something has hatched from the egg; he attempts to conceal it but it escapes and causes havoc at his sister's pool party. Daughtery and Connelly sneak onto the beach and bring back a hagfish that had been feeding on the carcass. Each returns to their home, and Daughtery sends the fish's stomach contents to be tested. As they wait for the results, reports of strange creatures beaching themselves around the world begin to surface. These three strangers may have stumbled upon the greatest secret in human history.

The creature that hatched from the "egg" Miles found appears to be a kind of web-footed aquatic lizard, possibly a Pliosaur (this is later proven to be false, as the show progresses to reveal the origin on the species). It has the ability to zap objects with an electrical charge and heal instantaneously. Miles's friend Phil names the creature Nimrod, shortened to "Nim".

Dr. Cirko discovers the origins of the creature, but is murdered before he can tell anyone. His assistant gives his research to Daughtery, who has already teamed up with Connelly.

In the remaining episodes we learn that agent Lee is actually a clone of one of the men on the original Kessler expedition. After some of the other young creatures attack him, Miles develops some of the creatures' abilities- electrical surges and a need for excess salt (as well as some form of communication with the creatures), due to Nim healing him by licking his bites and scratches. In the series finale the creatures' activities on the sea floor cause a massive earthquake which turns into a tsunami that destroys Puerto Rico and heads toward the east coast. Rich discovers a cryogenic version of Noah’s Ark in the Iderdex plant, along with dozens of monorails being sent into the Mariana Trench. The series ends with Miles finally meeting Laura and Rich during the evacuation. The last shot is of Miles, Laura, Rich and Caitlin looking out from the church steeple that they had climbed to in order to escape the waves to see how the tsunami has placed all of Wilmington, NC under water.

Themes
This TV series encompasses possible implications of genetic engineering, and modern biotechnology. The underlying theme of the series involves the artificial creation of an organism, through a secret biotechnological company. One scene in episode #113 involves a scientist (Dr. Morris) going for an interview for the company, where the interviewer reveals revelations such as the recovery of the Archaeopteryx, and that cloning Dolly the Sheep was 30 years after their secret company discovered how to clone.

Cast and characters

Episodes

Home media
On May 1, 2006 it was announced that Universal Studios Home Entertainment would be releasing the Surface - Season One DVD set on August 15, 2006. The DVD set was released with the title of Surface: The Complete Series. The complete series was released in Australia on April 4, 2007.

International distribution

Broadcast history
During the show's initial airing, Surface was also broadcast in syndication on the Sci-Fi Channel in the United States. In addition to U.S. network the programme was also broadcast in Canada on CH, as well as ITV2 in the  UK, Network Ten in Australia, VT4 in Belgium, on La Sexta and Calle 13 in Spain and on Universal Channel in Mexico. During the summer of 2006, the series was broadcast on ProSieben in Germany, by Fox on Portuguese and Brazilian cable networks, in Israel on Yes network, and on Canal+ in most of Scandinavia. During the summer of 2008, the series was broadcast on Veronica in The Netherlands.  The entire series was repeated in the UK on ITV1 between 23 July 2009 and 30 October 2009.

Surface was subsequently broadcast in Italy on Italia 1 and in Norway on TVNorge (started in June 2007), Portugal on TVI on Saturday afternoons, Australia on Network Ten on Sundays, 6.30pm, reruns on Sci Fi Channel (Australia), Spain on La Sexta (started in September 2007), Finland on MTV3, rebroadcast in Germany on ProSieben and in Canada on Space. In July 2007 the series was also being broadcast in Mauritius on MBC3 on Tuesday afternoons. In Poland on TVN Siedem broadcast the series starting in August 2007, and starting May 2008 it was repeated on TVN. Starting in November, 2007 it was broadcast in Greece on Alter Channel on Fridays at 21:00, in New Zealand on TV3 late Friday evenings, and in Croatia (Hrvatska) on RTL Televizija Wednesday at 22:30. The series was shown in March 2008 on StarWorld in Singapore, with repeats airing the next day at 11:00. On December 10, 2008 Surface started to be shown on Digit Alb + in Albania.  As of December, 2009, with the exception of episodes eight, eleven, and fourteen the show is available to stream on Hulu. As of 2010 the series is available to view in its entirety through Netflix's Instant Watch streaming service.

List of broadcasters
Albania: Digitalb
Argentina: Canal 13, Spanish, Mon-Fri (from March 2009).
Australia: Network Ten, Sci Fi Channel
Belgium: RTL-TVI
Brazil: Rede Record, Universal Channel
Canada: CH, Space
Colombia: Citytv Bogotá
Croatia: RTL Televizija (Croatian title: Stvorenja)
Chile: Red TV
Denmark: Canal+, DR1
Dominican Republic: Teleantillas (Canal 2)
France: Canal+, TF1
Finland: Canal+, Sub, MTV3
Germany: ProSieben, kabel eins (German title: Surface - Unheimliche Tiefe)
Greece: Alter (Greek title: Άγνωστος Εχθρός - Unknown Enemy)
Hungary: TV2
India: Star World (from 2008)
Israel: yesSTARS
Italy: Sky Uno, Italia 1
Latvia: TV6
Lithuania: TV6
Malaysia: TV3
Mauritius: MBC3
Mexico: Universal Channel
New Zealand: TV3 (from 2007)
Netherlands: Veronica (from May 2008)
North Macedonia: Kanal 5, (Macedonian title: Суштества)
Norway: Canal+ and Tvnorge (from 2007)
Paraguay: Canal 9 SNT
Peru: America TV
Poland: Canal+ Poland, TVN Siedem and TVN (Polish title: Na powierzchni - On the Surface)
Portugal: TVI, Fox
Russia: Channel One
Romania: Antena 1
Saudi Arabia: ShowSeries 1
Serbia: RTS2
Singapore: StarWorld Ch18, Starhub Cable. (Mon-Fri, from March 10, 2008)
Slovenia: Supernova, POP TV
Slovak Republic: STV 1 (Mon-Fri, from Sept. 2008)
Spain: laSexta
Sri Lanka: DialogTV
Sweden: Canal+, tv400
Turkey: Dizimax
Ukraine: 1+1
United Kingdom: ITV1 Thursdays from 23 July 2009 until 30 October 2009 ITV2. All subsequent episodes (pilot first shown on ITV1)
United States: NBC, UniversalHD

References

External links
 
 

2000s American science fiction television series
2005 American television series debuts
2006 American television series endings
NBC original programming
Television series by Universal Television
Television shows filmed in North Carolina
Television shows filmed in Wilmington, North Carolina
Television shows set in North Carolina